Joaquín Oliva Gomá (11 November 1926 in Guissona, Spain – 4 February 1993) was a Spanish professional association football player, who played as a defender.

Clubs
The most important part of his career is represented by the period he played for Real Madrid. He started over 100 matches for the Spanish side.

Titles
 3 La Liga
 2 European Cup

See also
List of football clubs in Spain
Football in Spain

References

1926 births
1993 deaths
CE Sabadell FC footballers
RCD Espanyol footballers
Real Madrid CF players
Association football defenders
Spanish footballers
Real Jaén footballers